The South Korea national football B team was the selection of South Korean semi-professional footballers and college footballers. Most of the members were playing in the Korean Semi-professional Football League, the Korean University Football League or the Korea National League. It was run as the reserve team of the South Korea national football team, and is currently managed as the South Korea Universiade football team (recognized as Republic of Korea by FISU) after Asia's minor competitions were in decline. The under-28 professionals and semi-professionals also can be selected for the Universiade team within two years of graduation from university.

History

First world title (1976)

Competitive record

AFC Asian Cup

Summer Universiade

East Asian Games

Honours
 AFC Asian Cup
  Third place: 1964

 Summer Universiade
  Gold medalists: 1991
  Silver medalists: 1987, 1993, 1995, 1997, 2015
  Bronze medalists: 2001

 FISU World University Championships
  Champions: 1976

 East Asian Games
  Gold medalists: 1993, 1997
  Silver medalists: 2001, 2013
  Bronze medalists: 2009

 Minor competitions'''
 Jakarta Anniversary Tournament: 1976, 1978
 King's Cup: 1977
 Saudi Tournament: 1978
 Merdeka Tournament: 1979, 1984, 1985
 Merlion Cup: 1992

See also

 Football in South Korea
 Korea Football Association
 South Korea national football team
 South Korea national under-23 football team
 South Korea national under-20 football team
 South Korea national under-17 football team
 South Korea women's national football team
 Korea Cup

References

External links

 
Asian national B association football teams